Design and Architecture Senior High School (DASH) is a magnet secondary school in the heart of the Design District in Miami, Florida, United States.  U.S. News & World Report ranked DASH as the 15th best public high school in the nation in 2009 and 16th best in 2012. Stacey Mancuso led DASH as Principal for 17 years from 1999 to 2016. The current principal is Dr. Maggie Rodriguez, who joined the school in 2022.

DASH is a part of the Miami-Dade County Public Schools district.

Awards
DASH was founded in 1990 by former principal Jacqueline Hinchey-Sipes, who coined the motto "Education by Design".  Over the past 15 years DASH has earned the reputation of being one of Florida's strongest public high schools, often making Miami-Dade county's highest marks on the FCAT (Florida Comprehensive Assessment Test) exam and consistently receiving an assessment grade of A by the state.  DASH has been featured in Dwell, Teen People magazine  (Cool School of the Month, May 2000), and the Miami Herald.  Newsweek ranked DASH as the 5th best public high school in the US for 2010.  Over 95% of DASH graduates continue on to college, with most students receiving scholarships from many of the nation's top art and design programs. It was named a Blue Ribbon School of Excellence, in 1994-96, 2007 and 2016.

U.S. News World & Report 2020, DASH was ranked #3 High School in Miami-Dade County, #6 High School in Florida, #25 Magnet High School in the Nation, #72 High School in the Nation.

Curriculum
The school features programs in architecture/interior design, entertainment technology, fashion design, industrial design, and visual communications/web design.  The curriculum includes a strong four-year foundation in the fine arts, internships with local design firms, and dual-enrollment college-level design courses, such as performance art, taught by professors from local colleges as well as field professionals.  Students take 8 courses a year (4 core classes, 2-3 art classes, and 1-2 electives) as opposed to the regular 6-course curriculum in most other Florida high schools.

Demographics
DASH is 54% Hispanic (of any race), 28% White non-Hispanic, 14% Black, and 4% Asian.

Fashion show
DASH holds an annual student-run fashion show in which the junior and senior fashion students show their collections to the community. In 2004, the school was invited to include its show as part of Miami's Fashion Week of the Americas, the US's largest Latin American fashion event.

Notable alumni
Denzel Curry, musician, rapper (was expelled/exited, then graduated from Carol City High School, class of 2013)
Cesar Santos, artist
Esteban Cortazar (MH Esteban), fashion designer
Anslem Richardson, actor, writer 
Daniel Arsham, multidisciplinary artist
Fabiola Arias, fashion designer
Charity Daw, songwriter, recording artist

References

External links
DASH website
DASH Alumni Association
DASH PTSA website

Magnet schools in Florida
High schools in Miami-Dade County, Florida
Public high schools in Florida
Miami-Dade County Public Schools
1990 establishments in Florida
Educational institutions established in 1990